Filippo Fiorelli (born 19 November 1994) is an Italian cyclist, who currently rides for UCI ProTeam . In October 2020, he was named in the startlist for the 2020 Giro d'Italia.

Major results
2015
 3rd GP Capodarco
2016
 5th Gran Premio Sportivi di Poggiana
2017
 9th Trofeo Città di Brescia
2019
 1st  Overall Tour of Albania
1st Points classification
1st Stage 4
2020
 10th Overall Sibiu Cycling Tour
2021
 1st Poreč Trophy
 2nd GP Adria Mobil
 2nd International Rhodes Grand Prix
 5th Overall Belgrade Banjaluka
 8th Coppa Bernocchi
 8th Clàssica Comunitat Valenciana 1969
2022
 5th Bretagne Classic
 7th Clàssica Comunitat Valenciana 1969
 8th Trofeo Playa de Palma
2023
 4th Per sempre Alfredo

Grand Tour general classification results timeline

References

External links

1994 births
Living people
Italian male cyclists
Sportspeople from Palermo
Cyclists from Sicily